This is a list of player transfers involving Pro12 teams before or during the 2014–15 season.

Benetton Treviso

Players in
 Davide Giazzon from  Zebre
 Bruno Mercanti from  Petrarca Padova
 Romulo Acosta from  Petrarca Padova
 Albert Anae from  Reds
 Josè Francisco Novak from  Petrarca Padova
 Rupert Harden from  Gloucester
 Salesi Manu from  Western Force
 Matteo Zanusso from  Amatori San Donà
 Meyer Swanepoel from  Mogliano
 Tomás Vallejos from  Coca-Cola Red Sparks
 Marco Barbini from  Mogliano
 Leo Auva'a from  Leinster
 Matt Luamanu from  Kyuden Voltex
 Alberto Lucchese from  Mogliano
 Henry Seniloli from  Tailevu Knights
 Joe Carlisle from  Wasps
 Simone Ragusi from  Rovigo Delta
 Enrico Bacchin from  Mogliano
 Jayden Hayward from  Western Force
 Sam Christie from  Waikato
 Ruggero Trevisan from  Zebre
 Amar Kudin from  Mogliano
 Marco Lazzaroni from  Mogliano
 D'Arcy Rae from  Glasgow Warriors
 Nicola Cattina unattached

Players out
 Tobias Botes to 
 Alberto De Marchi to  Sale Sharks
 Lorenzo Cittadini to  Wasps
 Luke McLean to  Sale Sharks
 Brendan Williams retired 
 Manoa Vosawai to  Cardiff Blues
 Christian Loamanu to  Leicester Tigers
 Leonardo Ghiraldini to  Leicester Tigers
 Robert Barbieri to  Leicester Tigers
 Michele Rizzo to  Leicester Tigers
 Alberto Di Bernardo to  Lille MR
 Valerio Bernabò to  Zebre
 Matt Berquist to  Hawke's Bay
 Enrico Ceccato to  Rovigo Delta
 Pedro Di Santo to  Uru Curè
 Marco Filippucci to  Mogliano
 Fabio Semenzato to  Mogliano
 Ignacio Fernandez Rouyet to  Mogliano
 Franco Sbaraglini released
 D'Arcy Rae to  Glasgow Warriors (from March 2015)

Cardiff Blues

Players in
 Craig Mitchell from  Exeter Chiefs
 Ieuan Jones from  Newport Gwent Dragons
 Adam Thomas from  Wales Sevens
 George Watkins from  Bristol Rugby
 Tavis Knoyle from  Gloucester Rugby
 Josh Turnbull from  Scarlets
 Jarrad Hoeata from  Highlanders
 Manoa Vosawai from  Benetton Treviso
 Geraint Walsh from  Pontypridd
 Gareth Anscombe from  Chiefs
 Adam Jones from  Ospreys
 Lucas González Amorosino from  Oyonnax

Players out
 Andries Pretorius to  Worcester Warriors
 Leigh Halfpenny to  Toulon
 Robin Copeland to  Munster
 Bradley Davies to  London Wasps
 Harry Robinson to  Scarlets
 Chris Czekaj to  US Colomiers
 Luke Hamilton to  SU Agen
 Alex Walker to  Ealing Trailfinders
 James Down to  London Welsh
 Benoit Bourrust to  La Rochelle
 Isaia Tuifua

Connacht

Players in
  Jack Carty promoted from academy
  Bundee Aki from  Chiefs
  Finlay Bealham promoted from academy
  Conor Finn promoted from academy
  Darragh Leader promoted from academy
  Tom McCartney from  
  Shane O'Leary from  Grenoble
  Ian Porter from  Ulster
  Mils Muliaina from  Chiefs
  John Cooney from  Leinster (loan)
  Quinn Roux from  Leinster (loan)
  Niyi Adeolokun from  Dublin University
  Shane Layden promoted from academy

Players out
  Eoin Griffin to  London Irish
  Kyle Tonetti retired
  Brett Wilkinson retired
  Aaron Conneely to  Lansdowne
  Gavin Duffy to Mayo Football
  Brian Murphy to  Galwegians
  Frank Murphy retired
  Dave Nolan to  Bourgoin
  Paul O'Donohoe retired
  Dan Parks retired
  James Rael to  Lansdowne
  Craig Clarke retired

Edinburgh

Players in
 Neil Cochrane from  London Wasps
 John Andress from  Worcester Warriors
 Rory Sutherland from  Gala RFC
 Tom Heathcote from  Bath Rugby
 Michael Tait from  Newcastle Falcons
 Fraser McKenzie from  Newcastle Falcons
 Jamie Ritchie from  Howe of Fife RFC
 Phil Burleigh from  Highlanders
 Anton Bresler from  
 Brett Thompson from  USA Sevens

Players out
 Steven Lawrie retired 
 Alun Walker released
 Alex Allan to  Glasgow Warriors
 Geoff Cross to  London Irish
 Lewis Niven released
 Sean Cox to  London Irish
 Robert McAlpine released
 Perry Parker to  Rotherham Titans
 Izak van der Westhuizen released
 Ross Rennie to  Bristol Rugby
 Dimitri Basilaia to  Perpignan
 Alex Black released
 Greig Laidlaw to  Gloucester Rugby
 Chris Leck released
 Piers Francis released
 Gregor Hunter released
 Harry Leonard to  Yorkshire Carnegie
 Ben Cairns retired 
 Nick De Luca to  Biarritz
 Lee Jones to  Glasgow Warriors
 Aleki Lutui to  Gloucester Rugby
 John Yapp to  Wasps
 Wicus Blaauw to released

Glasgow Warriors

Players in
 Alex Allan from  Edinburgh
 Lee Jones from  Edinburgh
 Murray McConnell from  Ayr RFC
 Euan Murray from  Worcester Warriors
 James Downey from  Munster
 Rossouw de Klerk from  Cheetahs 
 Connor Braid from  BC Bears

Players out
 Moray Low to  Exeter Chiefs
 Chris Cusiter to  Sale Sharks
 Ruaridh Jackson to  Wasps
 Ed Kalman retired
 Byron McGuigan released
 Finlay Gillies released
 Scott Wight to  Scotland Sevens
 Gabriel Ascárate released
 Carlin Isles to  USA Sevens
 Folau Niua to  USA Sevens
 D'Arcy Rae to  Benetton Treviso

Leinster

Players in
 Sam Coghlan Murray promoted from academy
 Jack Conan promoted from academy
 Kane Douglas from  NSW Waratahs
 Tadhg Furlong promoted from academy
 Seán McCarthy from  Jersey
 Luke McGrath promoted from academy
 Tyrone Moran from  Lansdowne
 Collie O'Shea promoted from academy
 Ben Te'o from  South Sydney Rabbitohs
 James Tracy promoted from academy

Players out
 Leo Auva'a to  Benetton Treviso
 Andrew Boyle to be confirmed
 John Cooney to Connacht (loan)
 Leo Cullen retired
 Conor Gilsenan to  London Irish
 Andrew Goodman to be confirmed
 Darren Hudson to  Bristol Rugby
 Jack O'Connell to  Bristol Rugby
 Brian O'Driscoll retired
 Quinn Roux to  Connacht (loan)

Munster

Players in
 Eusebio Guiñazú from  Bath
 Martin Kelly from  Dublin University
 Shane Buckley promoted from Academy
 Robin Copeland from  Cardiff Blues
 Jonathan Holland promoted from Academy
 Tyler Bleyendaal from  Crusaders
 Andrew Smith from  Brumbies

Players out
 James Coughlan to  Pau
 Ian Nagle to Club To Be Confirmed
 Niall Ronan Retiring due to injury
 James Downey to  Glasgow Warriors
 Casey Laulala to  Racing Métro
 Quentin MacDonald to

Newport Gwent Dragons

Players in
 Aled Brew from  Biarritz Olympique
 Lee Byrne from  Clermont Auvergne
 Rhys Buckley from  Moseley
 Boris Stankovich from  Leicester Tigers
 Ian Gough from  London Irish
 Dave Young from  Jersey
 Rynard Landman from 
 Lloyd Fairbrother from  Exeter Chiefs
 Andy Powell from  Wigan Warriors
 Brok Harris from  /

Players out
 Ieuan Jones to  Cardiff Blues
 Will Harries released
 Sam Parry to  Ospreys
 Dan Evans to  Ospreys
 Steffan Jones loan to  Bedford Blues
 Robert Sidoli retired
 Jevon Groves released
 Darren Waters to  London Welsh
 Kris Burton released
 Lewis Robling to  Jersey

Ospreys

Players in
 Sam Parry from  Newport Gwent Dragons
 Dan Evans from  Newport Gwent Dragons
 Josh Matavesi from  Worcester Warriors
 Rynier Bernardo from 
 Gareth Thomas from  Carmarthen Quins
 Cai Griffiths from  London Welsh
 Martin Roberts from  Bath Rugby
 De Kock Steenkamp from  Stormers

Players out
 Richard Hibbard to  Gloucester Rugby
 Joe Rees to  Worcester Warriors
 Matthew Morgan to  Bristol Rugby
 Ryan Jones to  Bristol Rugby
 Tom Isaacs to  Gloucester Rugby
 Ian Evans to  Bristol Rugby
 Adam Jones to  Cardiff Blues
 Tito Tebaldi to  Harlequins

Scarlets

Players in
 Regan King from  Clermont Auvergne
 Harry Robinson from  Cardiff Blues
 Peter Edwards from  London Welsh
 Rory Pitman from  Wasps
 Chris Hala'ufia from  London Irish
 Michael Tagicakibau from  Saracens
 Hadleigh Parkes from  Auckland

Players out
 Jonathan Davies to  Clermont Auvergne
 Josh Turnbull to  Cardiff Blues
 Aled Thomas to  Gloucester Rugby
 Deacon Manu to  Hong Kong Cricket Club (Head Coach)
 Sione Timani to  Tarbes
 Gareth Thomas to  Ospreys
 Nic Reynolds to  London Welsh
 Olly Barkley to  London Welsh
 Gareth Maule to  Bristol Rugby

Ulster

Players in
 Ian Humphreys from  London Irish
 Ruaidhrí Murphy from  Brumbies
 Wiehahn Herbst from 
 Dave Ryan from  Zebre
 Franco van der Merwe from 
 Louis Ludik from  Agen
 Charlie Butterworth from  Lansdowne
 Sean Reidy from  Counties Manukau
 Devin Montgomery from  
 Tim Boys from  Southland
 Michael Stanley from  Counties Manukau

Players out
 Tom Court to  London Irish
 John Afoa to  Gloucester
 Johann Muller retiring
 Niall Annett to  Worcester Warriors
 Chris Farrell to  Grenoble
 Adam Macklin to  Rotherham Titans
 James McKinney to  Rotherham Titans
 Paddy McAllister to  Aurillac
 Ian Porter to  Connacht
 Paddy Wallace retiring
 Chris Cochrane retiring
 David McIlwaine to  Yorkshire Carnegie
 Sean Doyle to  Brumbies
 Stephen Ferris retiring

Zebre

Players in
  Giulio Bisegni from  Lazio Rugby
  Hennie Daniller from 
  Andries Ferreira from 
  Andrea Lovotti from  Calvisano
  Kelly Haimona from  Calvisano
  Jacopo Sarto from  Petrarca Padova
  Lorenzo Romano from  Calvisano
  Michele Visentin from  Calvisano
  Valerio Bernabò from  Benetton Treviso
  Edoardo Padovani from  Mogliano
  Mirco Bergamasco from  Rovigo Delta
  Oliviero Fabiani from  Lazio Rugby

Players out
 Dave Ryan to  Ulster
 Salvatore Perugini retired
 Paolo Buso to  Rugby Olympique de Grasse
 Emiliano Caffini to  Rovigo Delta
 Nicola Cattina to  Benetton Treviso
 Filippo Cazzola to  Fiamme Oro
 Roberto Quartaroli to  Viadana
 Kameli Ratuvou released
 Ruggero Trevisan to  Benetton Treviso
 Michael van Vuren to  Mogliano
 Davide Giazzon to  Benetton Treviso

See also
List of 2014–15 Premiership Rugby transfers
List of 2014–15 Top 14 transfers
List of 2014–15 Super Rugby transfers
List of 2014–15 RFU Championship transfers

References

2014–15 Pro12
2014-15